Jean-Arnaud Tassy is a Haitian former soccer player and head coach.

Playing career
Tassy began playing soccer in the U.S. at Canton Junior College in Canton, New York, where he was a two-time All-American in 1968 and 1969. Then he was recruited by Fred Hartrick to play for Buffalo State College, where he earned Division I All-American honors his junior year. During that season, he led the Bengals to what was then the best season in school history (13–0–2), an appearance in the NCAA Tournament and a final season ranking of seventh in the nation.

After playing college soccer, he went on to play professionally. Tassy was drafted by the Toronto Metros in 1971, and then played two seasons with the New York City Cacos. He was invited to play for Haiti in the 1974 FIFA World Cup, but declined, due to the political climate of the country at the time.

Coaching career
Tassy is a USSF "B" licensed coach and holds degrees in Physical Education and French.

Tassy began coaching Niagara Purple Eagles men's soccer team in 1974, staying there until 1981. He then went on to Buffalo State College, a D-III team, leading the Bengals' men's team to three NCAA Tournament appearances (1982, 83 and 84). and producing seven All-Americans. In a later stage, he coached the women's team at the University at Buffalo, State University of New York, where he was named the Mid-American Conference Coach of the Year in 2000 (a first for a UB coach). He stepped back into a coaching role by assisting his son in coaching Westminster Catawba Christian School's Varsity Boys Soccer team during their 2020 season.

References

Living people
Haitian footballers
State University of New York at Canton alumni
American Soccer League (1933–1983) players
Haitian football managers
Niagara Purple Eagles men's soccer coaches
Buffalo State Bengals athletic directors
Buffalo Bulls women's soccer coaches
Association football midfielders
Year of birth missing (living people)
Buffalo State Bengals men's soccer players
Toronto Blizzard (1971–1984) players